Michael Grimm may refer to:
Michael Grimm (musician) (born 1978), American singer/songwriter
 Michael Grimm (album)
Michael Grimm (politician) (born 1970), former U.S. Representative
Michael Grimm, name once proposed for the Mortal Kombat character Johnny Cage